The Swedish International Stroke Play Championship or Swedish International (SI) was a golf tournament played in Sweden from 1945 to 2007. It has been featured on the Swedish Golf Tour and the Challenge Tour.

Named the Swedish Golf Federation 72-hole Stroke Play Championship at inception, it was known locally as the Svenskt Internationellt Slagtävlingsmästerskap (SISM) until it formally assumed the name Swedish International in 1984. Professionals and amateurs competed separately from 1945 to 1958, before being amateur only from 1959 to 1983, turning open to any golfer from 1984 with the introduction of the Swedish Golf Tour (SGT). Officially a Swedish National Championship starting in 1982, a separate National Champion was named in the event of a foreign winner. The tournament was discontinued after the 2007 season.

Winners

Amateur tournament

Amateur and professional tournament

Sources:

See also
Swedish Matchplay Championship
Swedish International Strokeplay Championship – Women's tournament

Notes

References

External links
Coverage on the Swedish Golf Federation's official site: All winners

Former Challenge Tour events
Swedish Golf Tour events
Golf tournaments in Sweden
Recurring sporting events established in 1945
Recurring sporting events disestablished in 2007
1945 establishments in Sweden
2007 disestablishments in Sweden